Martin Weppler (born 21 February 1958) is a retired West German sprinter who specialized in the 400 metres.

Biography 
He was born in Schramberg. He won a gold medal in the 4 x 400 metres relay at the 1978 European Championships together with Franz-Peter Hofmeister, Bernd Herrmann und Harald Schmid. He won a silver medal in 400 metres behind Andreas Knebel at the 1981 European Indoor Championships. At the 1983 World Championships he entered the 400 m competition without reaching the final and ran in the opening round of the relay race. The same thing happened at the 1984 Summer Olympics.

Domestically he won bronze medals at the West German championships in 1978, 1979, 1981 and 1983. He represented the sports team VfB Stuttgart, and VfL Sindelfingen from 1983.

His personal best was 45.74 seconds, achieved in July 1983 in Munich.

References

1958 births
Living people
People from Schramberg
Sportspeople from Freiburg (region)
West German male sprinters
Olympic athletes of West Germany
Athletes (track and field) at the 1984 Summer Olympics
European Athletics Championships medalists